Mark A. Burgman is an Australian ecologist, Director of the Centre for Environmental Policy and Professor in Risk Analysis & Environmental Policy, Imperial College London and Editor-in-Chief of the journal Conservation Biology. He was Director of the Australian Centre of Excellence for Risk Analysis (ACERA), latterly CEBRA, and Adrienne Clarke Chair of Botany at the University of Melbourne until 2017. He co-leads The SWARM Project at the University of Melbourne.

Early life and education
He was born in Wagga Wagga in 1956. He received a BSc from the University of New South Wales (1977), an MSc from Macquarie University, Sydney (1981), and a Ph.D. from Stony Brook University in the USA (1987).

Career
Burgman worked as a consultant ecologist and research scientist in Australia, the United States and Switzerland during the 1980s before joining the University of Melbourne in 1990.

He held the Adrienne Clarke Chair of Botany in the School of Botany (later the School of Biosciences from 2015) at the University of Melbourne, and became the foundation director of ACERA on its establishment in 2006-2013. ACERA and its successor, the Centre of Excellence for Biosecurity Risk Analysis
(CEBRA, 2013-2017) received millions of dollars of federal funding to research environmental and biosecurity risks, working with numerous partners.

Burgman has received research grants from the Australian Research Council, government agencies, industry and private foundations.

He is editor of Conservation Biology. He was also a founder of the University of Melbourne's Office for Environmental Programs in the early 2000s, which offers an innovative cross-Faculty environmental master's degree and now has over 400 students.

Scholarly contributions

Burgman works on applying model-based risk assessment to problems in conservation biology. His research has included models of a broad range of species including giant kelp, orange-bellied parrots, Leadbeater's possums, bandicoots, and banksias.  He has worked in a range of environments including marine fisheries, forestry, irrigation, electrical power utilities, mining, and national park planning. Latterly he has worked on expert scientific judgements.

He has published four authored books, two edited books, and 185 research papers (as of April 2017), and more than 70 reviewed reports and commentaries. His work has been cited 15,000 times (as of April 2017).

His most recent book is Trusting judgements: how to get the best out of experts which appeared through Cambridge University Press in 2015.

Honours
Royal Society of Victoria Medal for Scientific Excellence in the Biological Sciences (2013)
Fellow of the Australia Academy of Science (elected 2006)
Society for Conservation Biology Distinguished Service Award
Winner of the 2005 Eureka Prize for Biodiversity Research

References 

Australian ecologists
Academic staff of the University of Melbourne
Academics of Imperial College London
University of New South Wales alumni
Macquarie University alumni
People from Wagga Wagga
1956 births
Living people
Fellows of the Australian Academy of Science
Ecology journal editors